To Singapore, With Love is a 2013 Singaporean documentary film written and directed by Tan Pin Pin. The film featured interviews with nine Singaporean political dissidents, former activists and student leaders who fled Singapore from the 1960s to 1980s, living in exile.

The documentary won Tan the best director award in the Muhr AsiaAfrica Documentary section at 10th Dubai International Film Festival and the Best Asean Documentary at the Salaya International Documentary Festival. The film was shown at various film festivals at Malaysia, South Korea, England, Germany, Brazil  and United States.

Production 
The film was made with the support of the Busan International Film Festival's Asian Cinema Fund.

Release

Film Festivals 
The film made its world premiere at the Busan International Film Festival. The film also screened at Malaysia's FreedomFilmFest, the Berlin International Film Festival's Forum programme, Film Society of Lincoln Center, Seoul International Documentary Festival, Brazil's It's All True, Jogja-Netpac Film Festival, International Film Festival of Kerala, Diaspora Film Festival, Incheon and London's SEA ArtsFest, where it enjoyed four sold-out screenings over two days.

The film ran into controversy in Kuantan, Malaysia, where its October screening by human rights non-governmental organisation Pusat Komas under its annual FreedomFilmFest was cancelled after Putrajaya was alleged to have pressured the owner of the Kuantan venue that would have hosted the viewing. However, deputy home minister Datuk Dr Wan Junaidi Tuanku Jaafar denied the allegations, claiming that To Singapore, With Love was not banned and is still under scrutiny.

At the FreedomFilmFest screening in George Town, Penang, 15 officers from Malaysia's Ministry of Home Affairs turned up to stop the show, claiming that the film had not been vetted and approved by the film censor board. However, after half an hour of discussions with the organisers, the officers allowed the screening to proceed.

Singapore 
On 10 September 2014, the film was banned in Singapore, with the Media Development Authority claiming that it undermined national security as "the individuals in the film have given distorted and untruthful accounts of how they came to leave Singapore and remain outside Singapore," and that "a number of these self-professed 'exiles' were members of, or had provided support to, the proscribed Communist Party of Malaya (CPM)."

On 2 October 2014, Tan submitted To Singapore, With Love, unchanged, to the Media Development Authority's Film Appeals Committee to review the film's ban. In a statement, Tan wrote, "As we approach our 50th birthday, I feel that we as a people should be able to view and weigh for ourselves, through legitimate public screenings in Singapore, differing views about our past, even views that the government disagrees with. I hope that Film Appeals Committee will see the film and review the classification in this light." On 12 November 2014, Tan's review was denied. In a statement, the chairman of the Film Appeals Committee (FAC) said, "While of commendable artistic standard, the FAC found the film to be a one-sided account with minimal attempts to provide a balanced mix of views beyond those provided by the interviewees featured in the film". Of the 12 FAC members present, nine voted to uphold the classification while the other three voted that the film be given a Restricted 21 (R21) rating instead.

Response 
After the film was initially banned in September 2014, a group of 39 artists, including filmmakers Anthony Chen, Royston Tan and Kelvin Tong, released a joint statement expressing "deep disappointment" and urged the Media Development Authority to reverse the ban. Tan stated that she would consider re-submitting the film for a rating in the future. In addition, academic Cherian George commented on the ban, writing that it is "not just disproportionate. It is also an insult to Singaporeans, who are in effect being told that they are not smart enough to engage critically with Tan's film, no matter how biased it may be, and to weigh what her interviewees claim against what the official history states." Even Chua Mui Hoong, the opinion editor of the conservative The Straits Times, did not support the ban, writing, "When there are diverging interpretations of events, like the arrests of leftist activists in the 1960s to 1980s, the best antidote is not a ban on some points of view, but more openness and access to information...Singapore and its history do not belong to the ruling party." Chua had joined a group of about 350 Singaporeans who had travelled to Johor Baru, Malaysia, to watch To Singapore, With Love after the ban.

Awards 

 Best Director award in the Muhr AsiaAfrica Documentary section at 10th Dubai International Film Festival
 Best Asean Documentary, Special Mention at the Salaya International Documentary Festival in Thailand

References

External links 

2013 documentary films
Singaporean documentary films
Censored films
2013 films
2010s English-language films